Fabio Foglia (born 5 June 1989) is an Italian footballer who plays as a midfielder for Arezzo.

Club career
Foglia made his fourth-tier debut at Sangiovannese, where he played on loan from Piacenza. He made his professional, Lega Pro debut in the latter team in the first round of 2011–12 Lega Pro, on 4 September 2011 against Südtirol, playing 88 minutes, he scored the winner goal in the 71st minute. He played in fourth-tier Teramo and Torres, spent a year in Maceratese, before he signed to Arezzo in 2016.

On 7 January 2021, he joined Lecco on loan.

On 26 August 2021, he signed with Viterbese for a term of one year with an option to extend. On 29 January 2022, he moved to Pontedera. On 29 November 2022, Foglia returned to Arezzo.

References

External links
 

1989 births
Living people
People from Giulianova
Footballers from Abruzzo
Italian footballers
Association football midfielders
Serie C players
Serie D players
A.S. Pro Piacenza 1919 players
A.S.D. Sangiovannese 1927 players
S.S. Teramo Calcio players
S.E.F. Torres 1903 players
S.S. Maceratese 1922 players
S.S. Arezzo players
Calcio Lecco 1912 players
U.S. Viterbese 1908 players
U.S. Città di Pontedera players
Sportspeople from the Province of Teramo